M. japonica  may refer to:
 Mahonia japonica, a medium-sized shrub species native to northeastern China
 Majewskia japonica, a fungus species
 Mauremys japonica, the Japanese pond turtle, a turtle species endemic to Japan
 Melibe japonica, a sea slug species
 Meloimorpha japonica, the suzumushi or bell cricket, an insect species
 Monocentris japonica, a pinecone fish species found in the tropical Indo-West Pacific oceans
 Morula japonica, a sea snail species
 Muscina japonica, a fly species in the genus Muscina 
 Myrmarachne japonica, a jumping spider species in the genus Myrmarachne found in Russia, China, Korea, Taiwan and Japan

Synonyms
 Melia japonica, a synonym for Melia azedarach, the Persian lilac, white cedar, chinaberry, bead tree, lunumidella, Ceylon cedar and malai vembu, a deciduous tree species native to India, southern China and Australia
 Meristotheca japonica, a synonym for Meristotheca papulosa, the jiguancai or tosaka-nori, a red alga species popular as a sea vegetable in Taiwan and in Japan
 Moroteuthis japonica, a synonym for Moroteuthis robusta, the robust clubhook squid, a squid species

See also
 Japonica (disambiguation)